Cecil Charles McMaster (5 June 1895 – 11 September 1981) was a South African athlete, who competed in two consecutive Summer Olympics for his native country, starting in 1920. He won the bronze medal at the 1924 Summer Olympics held in Paris, France in the 10 kilometre walk. He was born in Port Elizabeth.

References

External links 
 
 

1895 births
1981 deaths
Sportspeople from Port Elizabeth
Athletes (track and field) at the 1920 Summer Olympics
Athletes (track and field) at the 1924 Summer Olympics
Olympic athletes of South Africa
Olympic bronze medalists for South Africa
South African male racewalkers
Medalists at the 1924 Summer Olympics
Olympic bronze medalists in athletics (track and field)
Cape Colony people